Symphyotrichum chihuahuense is a species of flowering plant in the family Asteraceae that is native to Chihuahua and Durango, Mexico. Its white ray florets open June–September, and it grows in grasslands and oak–pine woods at elevations .

Citations

References

chihuahuense
Flora of Mexico
Plants described in 2018
Taxa named by Guy L. Nesom